Universal Creative designs and creates themed attractions, rides, and resorts, for Universal Destinations & Experiences. Its divisions include master planning, creative development, design, engineering, project management, and research and development. The Universal Creative team is composed of artists, architects, engineers, designers, producers, builders, writers and more who design and create all of the themed entertainment experiences for Universal Destinations & Experiences.

It is best known for its design of immersive experiences based on NBCUniversal and third-party intellectual property. Notable classic and modern licensed properties used by Universal Creative include Harry Potter works and films, Dr. Seuss properties, The Simpsons, Jurassic Park, Spider-Man, Transformers, Despicable Me, and Nintendo franchises.

The company, headquartered in Orlando, operates at Universal Parks & Resorts locations around the world in the United States, Singapore, Japan, and China. Universal Creative often collaborates with a wide variety of external themed-entertainment design companies, including: Forrec, THG Creative, and P+A Projects.

History 
In December 1958, MCA, Inc. purchased the Universal City Studio Lot in California. After MCA and Universal merged in 1962, MCA-Universal expanded into recreation. In 1964, MCA-Universal officially opened Universal Studios Hollywood. As the park grew, Universal Creative was founded in 1968 under the name MCA Planning and Development as part of MCA-Universal's recreation division.

Universal Creative continued to operate through 1996 as MCA Planning and Development, opening Universal Studios Florida in 1990 and creating attractions such as Jaws and E.T. Adventure. In 1996, MCA was sold to Seagram, which changed the company name to Universal Studios, Inc. In 1997, MCA Planning and Development was renamed Universal Creative. Two years later, Universal Creative opened Islands of Adventure at Universal Orlando Resort.

The company moved to Universal Orlando Resort in 2001, the same year it opened Universal Studios Japan. In 2011, Comcast purchased NBCUniversal, incorporating Universal Parks & Resorts and Universal Creative into its portfolio. Universal Studios Singapore, a joint venture with Resort World Sentosa on Sentosa Island, was opened by Universal Creative in the same year. The company opened the world's first "Water Theme Park" in 2017 with the opening of Universal's Volcano Bay. In 2021, Universal opened Universal Beijing Resort which was the first ever theme park to achieve a LEED Certification. The company's latest project is Universal's Epic Universe, which will become the fourth park at the Universal Orlando Resort. Universal Creative currently has offices in Hollywood, Orlando, Osaka, and Beijing.

Executive Leadership 

As of December 13th, 2022, the following information is outdated, as several individuals on this list have retired from Universal Creative as part of an NBC-wide retirement initiative. This list will be updated when their replacements are announced:
 Mike Hightower: President, Universal Creative Universal Destinations & Experiences
 Modesto Alcala: Senior Vice President, Global Restaurant Development
 Steve Blum: Senior Vice President, Ride Safety & Engineering
 Thierry Coup: Senior Vice President, Chief Creative Officer
 Russ Dagon: Senior Vice President, Resort Development
 Gene Dobrzyn: Senior Vice President, Project Management Office
 Brawner Greer: Senior Vice President, Legal Affairs
 Charlie Gundacker: Senior Vice President, Executive Project Director
 Caryl Lucarelli: Senior Vice President, Human Resources, Universal Creative, and International
 Daniel Memis: Senior Vice President, Chief Financial Officer

Notable projects

Attractions

Universal's Volcano Bay 
Volcano Bay is Universal's first attempt at developing a water park. This project became the third park at Universal Orlando Resort after replacing Wet 'n Wild Orlando in 2017. The park icon is "Krakatau," a 200-foot-tall volcano at the center of the park. Volcano Bay brought a variety of new types of slides to the Orlando area. Including water coasters, capsule plunge slides, and slides that drop riders four feet above the pool below. Similarly to Disney's MagicBands, one of the biggest features of Volcano Bay is its TapuTapu wristband technology. Universal Creative further utilized this technology with the development of their Super Nintendo World areas.

Jurassic World VelociCoaster 
VelociCoaster is Florida's fastest, tallest, and most intense launch coaster ever created, catapulting riders 155 feet into the air at speeds up to 70 mph. VelociCoaster features two high-speed launches powered by linear synchronous motors, a signature 155-foot-tall top hat, four inversions, and a first-of-its-kind barrel roll over water named the mosasaurs roll.

Super Nintendo World  
Universal Studios Japan contains the world's first Super Nintendo World area. This area contains dozens of interactive elements, as well as two rides that let guests experience the world of the Super Mario franchise. Universal Creative worked closely with Nintendo, including Shigeru Miyamoto, to create an artistically accurate and innovative area. The rides in this land include Mario Kart: Koopa's Challenge, a technologically groundbreaking interactive dark ride that features augmented reality based on the Mario Kart spin-off franchise. Super Nintendo World makes use of "Power-Up Bands" to interact with certain elements in the land, such as the "Power-Up Band Key Challenges," and track high-scores through the official Universal Studios Japan smartphone application.

Hagrid's Magical Creatures Motorbike Adventure 
Universal Creative's Hagrid's Magical Creatures Motorbike Adventure is considered to be the world's first "story coaster". The Creative team's coaster broke multiple records by being the first coaster in the U.S. to have a free-fall vertical drop (17 feet), catapulting guests 65 feet in the air at more than a 70-degree angle and then immediately dropping them back down in one movement, having the most launches of any coaster in the world (7 total), and containing the longest coaster track in Florida, measuring approximately a mile in length. The construction of this attraction also included planting a forest of 1,200 trees.

Hagrid's Magical Creatures Motorbike Adventure won the Thea Award from the Themed Entertainment Association for outstanding achievement, the Best New Roller Coaster Award from Theme Park Insider, and was named "best new attraction installation of 2019" from the 2019 Golden Ticket Awards.

Transformers: The Ride - 3D 
Universal Creative, in partnership with Oceaneering International and Industrial Light & Magic, created Transformers: The Ride - 3D to be featured at Universal Studios Singapore, Universal Studios Hollywood, and Universal Orlando Resort. The attraction blends computer-generated imagery with reality through the use of 14 screens and a variety of physical props. Universal Creative first opened this attraction in Singapore in 2011 and Hollywood in 2012, followed by Orlando in 2013. Universal Creative's largest challenge for creating the Orlando iteration of the ride was real-estate space, which prompted it to be designed as a vertical, two-story experience. Transformers: The Ride - 3D has won numerous awards, including the Thea Award for outstanding achievement, the International 3D Society Lumiere Award, and was named "best new attraction" from Theme Park Insider.

The Amazing Adventures of Spider-Man 
"All of your visceral, aural and visual input has to be in perfect sync," says Steve Blum, Senior Vice President of Ride Safety and Engineering. "Humans are very sensitive to anomalies in their environment: If you don't give them the right input, they detect right away that it's not real." Universal Creative partnered with Oceaneering International to create a 12-passenger motion-base simulator pod capable of six degrees of freedom (heave, sway, surge, yaw, pitch, and roll) and 360-degree rotation (achieved with a ring and pinion gear system), all contained in an angled shell to direct riders' view. Universal Creative's Phil Hettema and William Mason received inventor credits on the ride system patent, known as the SCOOP.

Universal Creative employees Scott Trowbridge and Thierry Coup storyboarded a scene-by-scene breakdown of the ride that would be projected onto thirteen 30-foot-tall projection screens integrated with physical sets. Since guests would be moving toward, away from, or past these 3D screens, animators had to consider the perspective shift that viewers would actually encounter if these really. They developed a new process they called "squinching", used to account for a viewer's moving sightline and distorting the animation to match.

Created for the Islands of Adventure theme park that opened on May 28, 1999, The Amazing Adventures of Spider-Man won Amusement Todays Golden Ticket Award for Best Dark Ride for twelve consecutive years from 1999 through to 2010. It has since placed second in that category, after fellow Islands of Adventure attraction, Harry Potter and the Forbidden Journey, took the top spot in 2011. In 2000, the ride won a Thea Award from the Themed Entertainment Association for outstanding themed entertainment and experience design. It has also won numerous public-voted Theme Park Insider Awards and Screamscape Ultimate Awards. The ride has been duplicated at Universal Studios Japan, which opened in January 2004.

Harry Potter and the Forbidden Journey 

Harry Potter and the Forbidden Journey opened in June 2010 as part of The Wizarding World of Harry Potter - Hogsmeade at Islands of Adventure. It features robotic arms as a ride vehicle which are mounted on a track, to travel through the attraction while performing their movements in synchronization with the ride's show elements (animated props, projection surfaces, and so on). In Amusement Today's annual Golden Ticket Awards, Harry Potter and the Forbidden Journey debuted as the best new ride of 2010. It won the Best Dark Ride category for five consecutive years from 2011 to 2015. Due to the massive popularity of the ride, it was duplicated at Universal Studios Japan (which opened on July 18, 2014) and Universal Studios Hollywood (which opened on April 7, 2016).

Resorts 
The Universal Creative Resort Development team designs and develops resort, hotel, restaurant, and retail experiences for Universal Parks & Resorts. Universal Orlando Resort's long-standing partnership with Loews Hotels led to the development of Loews Portofino Bay Hotel, Hard Rock Hotel, Loews Royal Pacific Resort, Cabana Bay Beach Resort, Loews Sapphire Falls Resort, Universal's Aventura Hotel, Universal's Endless Summer Resort – Surfside, and Universal's Endless Summer Resort – Dockside. Universal Creative has recently opened resorts include The Universal Studios Grand Hotel and the NUO Resort Hotel – Universal Beijing Resort at Universal Beijing Resort.

Restaurants 

Universal Creative designs and develops the restaurants inside Universal's theme parks, as well as their Universal City Walk shopping and restaurant areas. Award-winning restaurants within the parks include Mythos Restaurant, The Leaky Cauldron, and The Three Broomsticks at Universal Orlando Resort. Award-winning restaurants in Universal CityWalk Orlando include The Cowfish, Vivo Italian Kitchen, Toothsome Chocolate Emporium, and Savory Feast Kitchen. Other restaurants shared between  several Universal City Walk areas include Jimmy Buffett's Margaritaville, Bubba Gump, and Voodoo Doughnut.

All projects

Current projects 
Universal Creative is in the process of developing Epic Universe. 

Epic Universe, the fourth park to be added to the Universal Orlando Resort portfolio, was announced in August 2019. It will feature an entertainment center, hotels, shops, restaurants and more. It is expected to be located within a larger 750-acre site that will nearly double Universal's total available acreage in Central Florida. No opening date has been announced.

On January 11, 2023, Universal announced two projects: a "new concept"-styled theme park geared towards families with children in Frisco, Texas, and a "horror-experience" in Las Vegas, Nevada.

Past projects

Patents 
Universal Creative files numerous patents for new technologies with the United States Patent and Trademark Office. In 2019, Universal Creative filed 43 patents. Some notable patents include the SCOOP ride vehicle designed for The Amazing Adventures of Spider-Man in Universal Orlando Resort, interactive wand technology for the Wizarding World of Harry Potter, and moving portraits for the queue of Harry Potter and the Forbidden Journey.  "We actually had to create the technology which was used to make those portraits look like moving paintings," said Thierry Coup, Senior Vice President of Universal Creative's Creative Studio. "There's a whole portfolio of patents that Universal filed just with the creation of this attraction."

Awards

Thea Awards

The Golden Ticket Awards presented by Amusement Today

Theme Park Insider Awards

Brass Ring Awards

See also 

 Walt Disney Imagineering, Disney Parks' equivalent

References 

Amusement ride manufacturers
Design companies established in 1968
Universal Parks & Resorts
Manufacturing companies established in 1968
1968 establishments in California
Companies based in Orlando, Florida